Jochen Summer (born 28 May 1977) is an Austrian former racing cyclist.

Major results
2002
1st Stage 5 Tour of Greece
2003
1st GP Voralberg
2005
1st Poreč Trophy
1st Stage 7 Tour of Austria

References

External links

1977 births
Living people
Austrian male cyclists